The first USS Gettysburg was a steamer in the Union Navy. The ship was built in Glasgow, Scotland in 1858, named Douglas, and operated for the Isle of Man Steam Packet Company between Liverpool, United Kingdom and Douglas on the Isle of Man until November 1862. She was then sold to the Confederacy, renamed Margaret and Jessie, and operated as a blockade runner until her capture by the Union on 5 November 1863. The ship was renamed Gettysburg, and commissioned into the Union Navy on 2 May 1864.

During her military service, Gettysburg operated with the North Atlantic Blockading Squadron, was involved in both the first and second attacks on Fort Fisher, helped lay telegraph cables between Key West and Havana and undertook navigational surveys of the Caribbean and the Mediterranean.

Gettysburg was decommissioned on 6 May 1879 and sold two days later.

Construction and dimensions
Douglas was built by Robert Napier & Co. in Glasgow in 1858. Napier's also supplied her engines and boilers. Her purchase cost was £17,500, plus an allowance from Napier's of £5,000 for the King Orry.

The first Steam Packet steamer with a straight stern, no fiddle bow and no figurehead. She was launched at 13:30hrs on Wednesday 28 April 1858, the christening of the ship being performed by the wife of John Napier. Also in attendance on behalf of the Isle of Man Steam Packet was Captain Edward Quayle, the Commodore of the Company.

The launch had been delayed for a short period as the berth where her fitting out was to take place was occupied by another vessel. Following her launching she was towed to Launcefield Dock in order to receive her engines. Douglas was fitted with a full complement of lifeboats, these being fitted with Clifford's patent lowering apparatus, which enabled the boats to be lowered safely whilst the vessel was under steam.

Below the main saloon and ladies cabin, in one of the watertight compartments was the cargo hold which also contained two fresh water storage tanks each capable of accommodating 500 gallons of water. Moving aft, the cargo hold was followed by the fuel bunkers, furnaces and engines.

Pre-Civil War

Isle of Man Steam Packet Company, 1858–1862

PS (RMS) Douglas (I) No. 20683; the first ship in the line's history to be so named, and the ninth to be ordered by the Company, was an iron paddle steamer which served with the Isle of Man Steam Packet Company until she was sold in 1862. She was sold to Cunard, Wilson & Co, on behalf of the Confederate agents, Fraser, Trenholm & Co. She was renamed Margaret and Jessie and sailed in gray livery for the Confederate States.

Due to increasing passenger traffic between the Isle of Man and England, it was decided in 1858 that a larger, faster ship would be ordered for the packet fleet. During trials, she achieved , and was declared the fastest Channel Steamer in existence during the period.

Appearance and furnishings
Douglas was considered an elegant ship. She had a raised quarterdeck below which was situated a spacious and beautifully fitted up saloon, ladies cabin and sleeping cabins, with accommodation for 100 first class passengers. These cabins ran the full length of the quarterdeck and were lit by large, wide, sky lights two large deck windows and sixteen side windows. The chief saloon was well decorated with three large marble tables with mahogany tops the seats to which had a movable back to allow the occupier to sit either facing toward or away from the table. On the wall at the aft end of the saloon were hung two pictures, one of Douglas Harbour and the other of Liverpool. Seventy people could be accommodated to dine at any given time.

Her deck was said to be clear and roomy with a hurricane deck situated between the paddle boxes which was 50 ft long and roofed over on all sides.

The steerage passengers were accommodated in the forward part of the ship and as was the case with first class a ladies lounge was provided. Beyond this, and in the immediate vicinity of the forecastle was situated the crew's quarters.

Mail and cargo
Douglas was designed to carry a mixture of passengers and cargo.
Her designation as a Royal Mail Ship (RMS) indicated that she carried mail under contract with the Royal Mail. A specified area was allocated for the storage of letters, parcels and specie (bullion, coins and other valuables). This was situated in the forecastle beneath the crew's quarters and was accessible only by a specified ship's officer.

In addition, there was a considerable quantity of regular cargo, ranging from furniture to foodstuffs.

Maiden voyage
Douglas made her maiden voyage from Glasgow to Douglas on Saturday 3 July 1858. Having made passage from the Clyde in a time of 8 hours 30 minutes her arrival off Onchan Head was heralded by cannon fire from the Conister Rock, Fort Anne and the Castle Mona. As she entered Douglas Bay she stopped and embarked several directors of the Steam Packet Company before sailing across the bay several times among a large number of small boats which had put to sea for the occasion. A large crowd had gathered on the Red Pier in order to welcome her and after she had secured alongside many of these people were able to view the interior of the ship with further public viewings made available over the following two days.

Douglas was claimed to be the fastest steamer then afloat. She attracted wide attention, and her speed made her a strong candidate for more advanced adventures and was acclaimed as "comme le premier" among cross-channel steamers.

Service life
Certified by the Board of Trade to carry between 800 - 900 passengers and longer and faster than her forerunners, Douglas was built to help meet the steady increase in passenger traffic to and from the Isle of Man and under the command of Captain Quayle made her inaugural crossing from Douglas to Liverpool on Tuesday 6 July 1858.
On the home run Douglas would routinely record a passage time of 4 hours 40 minutes.

While in the Steam Packet's colours, the only event of interest – apart from the way she broke the record for the home run – was her collision with the brig Dido, which cost the Company £400 in damages.

One accident which befell a passenger was on Monday 16 April 1860, whilst she was making passage to Liverpool. One passenger, a sailor who had been home on leave from the Royal Navy and who was serving on HMS Majestic, whilst in a state of intoxication scaled his way up the foremast head and got himself on to the fore stay. However, in his attempt to come down he fell some 30 feet to the deck. He was subsequently treated by a doctor who happened to be on board and on arrival in Liverpool was transferred to the Northern Hospital.

Ancillary work consisted of charter sailings and day excursions, one of which was on 14 October 1859, when the Douglas took an excursion to Holyhead to see the ocean liner Great Eastern. At one time she was chartered to Henderson's of Belfast for three weeks for the then notable fee of £200 per week.

SS Margaret and Jessie
After only four years in Steam Packet ownership, Douglas was sold to Cunard, Wilson and Co., who were really acting as brokers for the Confederate Agents, Fraser, Trenholm and Co. for £24,000. Douglas departed her home port for the last time on Sunday 16 November 1862.

Whilst in Liverpool Douglas was painted light grey and loaded with cargo departed for Nassau under the command of Captain Corbett on Tuesday 2 December 1862, arriving in Nassau in late January, 1863.

Douglas made an ideal blockade runner in the American Civil War. She was then owned by the Charleston Import and Export Company. She successfully managed to run the blockade and reached Charleston on 31 January, bringing in much needed supplies and subsequently departed for Nassau with a cargo of cotton. She successfully ran the blockade on numerous other occasions.

Douglas was subsequently renamed Margaret and Jessie in honour of the daughters of her new owner, both of whom were on board her during her initial blockade run outbound from Charleston.

On 1 June 1863 off Nassau Margaret and Jessie was gunned down and driven ashore by a Union gunboat. A few days later she escaped although damaged, went back to blockade running and was later captured. Some records maintain that after she was driven ashore and had escaped to Nassau, she took no further part in the American Civil War, and her engines were said to be seen rusting on the Nassau beach as late as 1926.

The official history of the ship in the library of the Department of the Navy, Washington D.C., clarifies the conflicting reports.

1863 capture

She was purchased from the New York Prize Court by the Navy and commissioned Gettysburg at New York Navy Yard on 2 May 1864, Lieutenant Roswell Lamson commanding.

Refitting
She had been armed with a 30-pounder Parrot gun, two 12-pounders, and four 24-pounder howitzers. Her tonnage was now given as 950 and she was apparently lengthened by 16 feet to 221 feet. When commissioned, she had a ship's company of 96. She joined the North Atlantic Blockading Squadron, and captured several ships which were running supplies to the South.

Civil War

North Atlantic Blockading Squadron
A fast, strong steamer, Gettysburg was assigned blockading duty with the North Atlantic Blockading Squadron, and departed New York on 7 May. She arrived at Beaufort, North Carolina on 14 May and from there took station at the entrance to the Cape Fear River.

For the next seven months, Gettysburg was engaged in the vital business of capturing blockade runners carrying supplies to the strangling South. She captured several ships, and occasionally performed other duties. On 8 October, for instance, she rescued six survivors from schooner Home, which had capsized in a squall.

Battle of Fort Fisher
Gettysburg took part in the attack on Fort Fisher on 24–25 December 1864. Gettysburg assisted with the devastating bombardment prior to the landings by Army troops, and during the actual landings stood in close to shore to furnish cover for the assault. Gettysburgs boats were used to help transport troops to the beaches.

With the failure of the first attack on the Confederate works, plans were laid for another assault, this time including a landing force of sailors and marines to assault the sea face of the fort. In this second attack on 15 January 1865, Gettysburg again engaged the fort in the preliminary bombardment, and furnished a detachment of sailors under Lt. Roswell Lamson and other officers in an assault, which was stopped under the ramparts of Fort Fisher. Lamson and a group of officers and men were forced to spend the night in a ditch under Confederate guns before they could escape. Though failing to take the sea face of Fort Fisher, the attack by the Navy diverted enough of the defenders to make the Army assault successful. Gettysburg suffered two men killed and six wounded in the assault.

Gettysburg spent the remaining months of the war on blockade duty off Wilmington, North Carolina, and operated from April–June between Boston, Massachusetts and Norfolk, Virginia carrying freight and passengers. She was decommissioned on 23 June at New York Navy Yard.

Post-war

Caribbean, 1866–1875
Recommissioning on 3 December 1866, Gettysburg made a cruise to the Caribbean Sea, returning to Washington on 18 February, and decommissioning again on 1 March 1867.

Gettysburg went back into commission on 3 March 1868 at Norfolk and put to sea on 28 March on special service in the Caribbean. Until July 1868, she visited various ports in the area protecting American interests, among them Kingston, Jamaica, Havana, Cuba, and ports of Haiti. From 3 July – 13 August, Gettysburg assisted in the laying of a telegraph cable from Key West to Havana, and joined with scientists from the Hydrographic Office in a cruise to determine the longitudes of West Indian points using the electric telegraph. From 13 August 1868 – 1 October 1869, she cruised between various Haitian ports and Key West. Gettysburg arrived at the New York Navy Yard on 8 October, decommissioned the same day, and entered the Yard for repairs.

Gettysburg was laid up in ordinary until 6 November 1873, when she again commissioned at Washington Navy Yard. She spent several months transporting men and supplies to the various Navy Yards on the Atlantic coast, and on 25 February 1874 anchored in Pensacola harbor to embark members of the survey team seeking routes for an inter-oceanic canal in Nicaragua. Gettysburg transported the engineers to Aspinwall, Panama and Greytown, Nicaragua, and returned them to Norfolk on 10 May 1874. After several more trips on the Atlantic coast with passengers and supplies, the ship again decommissioned on 9 April 1875 at Washington Navy Yard.

Recommissioned on 21 September, Gettysburg departed Washington for Norfolk, where she arrived on 14 October. Assigned to assist in another of the important Hydrographic Office expeditions in the Caribbean, she departed Norfolk on 7 November. During the next few months she contributed to safe navigation in the West Indies in surveys that led to precise charts. She returned to Washington with the scientific team on 14 June, decommissioning on 26 June.

Mediterranean, 1876–1879
Gettysburg recommissioned on 20 September 1876, for special duty to the Mediterranean, where she was to obtain navigational information about the coasts and islands of the area. Gettysburg departed Norfolk on 17 October for Europe. During the next two years, she visited nearly every port in the Mediterranean, taking soundings and making observations on the southern coast of France, the entire coastline of Italy, and the Adriatic Islands. Gettysburg continued to the coast of Turkey, and from there made soundings on the coast of Egypt and other North African points, Sicily and Sardinia. On 1 October 1878, while the ship was off the coast of Algeria, Landsman Walter Elmore rescued a fellow sailor from drowning, for which he was awarded the Medal of Honor.

While visiting Genoa on 22 April 1879, Gettysburg rescued the crew of a small vessel which had run upon the rocks outside the breakwater.

Decommissioning and fate
Her iron plates corroded from years of almost uninterrupted service and her machinery weakened, Gettysburg was decommissioned on 6 May and sold two days later.

References

Bibliography
 

 Lamson of the Gettysburg: The Civil War Letters of Lieutenant Roswell H. Lamson, U.S. Navy, James M. and Patricia R. McPherson, eds. (Oxford Univ. Press 1999)
 Chappell, Connery (1980). Island Lifeline T.Stephenson & Sons Ltd

External links

 A drawing by USS Gettysburg Ensign Francis P. B. Sands of the aftermath of the Battle of Fort Fisher

Ferries of the Isle of Man
Steamships of the United States Navy
Ships of the Union Navy
American Civil War patrol vessels of the United States
Ships built on the River Clyde
1858 ships